Humberto Rosa may refer to:

 Humberto Rosa (footballer) (1932–2017), Argentine football player and coach
 Humberto Rosa (painter) (1908–1948), Brazilian artist